The tornado outbreak sequence of April 17–19, 1970  was a tornado outbreak sequence that occurred on April 17–19, 1970, across parts of the Midwest and South. An outbreak on April 17 produced many strong tornadoes, including four violent and long-lived tornadoes, in New Mexico, western Texas, and the Texas Panhandle. More tornadoes hit East Texas and Oklahoma on April 18, and additional tornadoes affected the Mississippi Valley and Midwest regions on April 19. At least 33 tornadoes occurred, 17 of which were F2 or greater (significant) in intensity. In addition to confirmed tornadoes, a possible F2 tornado hit the southern suburbs of Pampa, Texas, at 12:40 a.m. CST on April 18, unroofing or severely damaging 20 homes, destroying several trailers, and damaging municipal buildings.

Confirmed tornadoes

April 17 event

April 18 event

April 19 event

See also
 List of North American tornadoes and tornado outbreaks

Notes

References

Bibliography

Tornadoes in New Mexico
Tornadoes in Texas
Tornadoes in Oklahoma
Tornadoes in Louisiana
Tornadoes in Tennessee
Tornadoes in Mississippi
Tornadoes in Utah
Tornadoes in Arkansas
Tornadoes in Illinois
Tornadoes in Missouri
Tornadoes in Florida
Tornadoes in Georgia (U.S. state)
Tornadoes in Indiana
Tornadoes of 1970
1970 natural disasters in the United States
1970 in New Mexico
1970 in Texas
April 1970 events in the United States